Admiral Thomas Graves, 1st Baron Graves, KB (23 October 1725 – 9 February 1802) was a British officer of the Royal Navy and a colonial official. He served in the Seven Years' War and the American War of Independence. He was also the Commodore-Governor of Newfoundland for a period of time.

Military career 
Born in England in October 1725, Graves was the second son of Rear-Admiral Thomas Graves of Thanckes in Cornwall.

Graves' first military experience was as a volunteer with Commodore Henry Medley's crew around 1740. He was promoted to lieutenant in 1743, and captain in 1755. In the first year of the Seven Years' War, Graves failed to confront a French ship which gave challenge. He was tried by court-martial for not engaging his ship, and reprimanded. Graves became Commodore-Governor of Newfoundland in 1761 and given the duty of convoying the seasonal fishing fleet from England to the island. In 1762 he learned that French ships had captured St. John's. Graves, Admiral Alexander Colville and Colonel William Amherst retook the port city.

With the end of the Seven Years' War, Labrador came under his responsibility as French fishing fleets returned to the French Shore and St. Pierre and Miquelon.  Graves strictly enforced the treaties to the extent that the French government protested. Graves' governorship ended in 1764. He returned to active service during the American War of Independence and became commander-in-chief of the North American Squadron in 1781. when Mariot Arbuthnot returned home.

During the American Revolution, his fleet was defeated by the Comte de Grasse in the Battle of the Chesapeake at the mouth of Chesapeake Bay on 5 September 1781, leading to the surrender of Lord Cornwallis at Yorktown.

In September 1782, a fleet under his command was caught in a violent storm off the banks of Newfoundland. In 1786 Graves became Commander-in-Chief, Plymouth.

With the French Revolutionary Wars, Graves was second in command to Admiral Richard Howe at the British victory over the French at the Battle of the Glorious First of June 1794. Graves became a full admiral and was awarded an Irish peerage as Baron Graves, of Gravesend in the County of Londonderry.

Personal life 
Lord Graves married Elizabeth, daughter of William Peere Williams, in 1771. The couple had a son, Thomas, in 1775. Following several battle injuries, Graves retired to his Devon estate in 1794, and died in February 1802, aged 76.

Arms

See also 
 Governors of Newfoundland
 List of people of Newfoundland and Labrador

Notes

References 
 Kidd, Charles, Williamson, David (editors). Debrett's Peerage and Baronetage (1990 edition). New York: St Martin's Press, 1990,

External links 
 Biography at Government House The Governorship of Newfoundland and Labrador
 

|-

|-

|-

1725 births
1802 deaths
Royal Navy personnel of the American Revolutionary War
Governors of Newfoundland Colony
Barons in the Peerage of Ireland
Peers of Ireland created by George III
Royal Navy admirals
Knights Companion of the Order of the Bath
Members of the Parliament of Great Britain for constituencies in Cornwall
British MPs 1774–1780